The Baboia (also: Eruga) is a right tributary of the river Desnățui in Romania. It discharges into the Desnățui near Goicea. It flows through the villages Verbița, Orodel, Vârtop, Caraula, Galicea Mare, Siliștea Crucii and Afumați.

References

Rivers of Romania
Rivers of Dolj County